The year 1972 in science and technology involved some significant events, listed below.

Astronomy and space exploration
 January 5 – President of the United States Richard Nixon orders the development of a Space Shuttle program.
 February 4 – Mariner 9 sends pictures from Mars.
 February 21 – The Soviet unmanned spacecraft Luna 20 lands on the Moon.
 March 2 – Launch of Pioneer 10 spacecraft.
 April 16 – Apollo 16 launched.
 June 30 – The International Time Bureau adds the first leap second to Coordinated Universal Time (UTC).
 July 23 – The United States launches Landsat 1, the first Earth-resources satellite.
 December 7 – Apollo 17 launched with three astronauts and five mice,  and The Blue Marble photograph of the Earth is taken.
 December 11 - NASA astronauts Eugene Cernan and Harrison Schmitt land on the Moon and begin a three-day exploration.

Biology
 February – S. J. Singer and Garth L. Nicolson describe the fluid mosaic model of the functional cell membrane.
 September – Geoffrey Burnstock proposes the existence of a non-adrenergic, non-cholinergic (NANC) neurotransmitter, which he identifies as adenosine triphosphate (ATP), originating the term 'purinergic signalling'.
 Niles Eldredge and Stephen Jay Gould publish their landmark paper on punctuated equilibrium.
 Socorro doves (Zenaida graysoni) last seen in the wild. The species precariously survives in captivity. A reintroduction program is being prepared.

Computer science
 April 6 – Cray Research founded.
 May – Magnavox release the first home video game console which can be connected to a television set – the Magnavox Odyssey, invented by Ralph H. Baer.
 July 12 — First C compiler released.
 October – The First International Conference on Computer Communications is held in Washington, D.C. and hosts the first public demonstration of ARPAnet, a precursor of the Internet.
 November 29 – Atari release the production version of Pong, one of the first video games, devised by Nolan Bushnell and Allan Alcorn.
 Karen Spärck Jones introduces the concept of inverse document frequency (idf) weighting in information retrieval.
 Write-only memory is devised as a joke in Signetics.

Earth sciences
 February 8 – First Global Boundary Stratotype Section and Point (GSSP) defined at the Silurian-Devonian boundary at Klonk in the Czech Republic.

Ecology
 January – A Blueprint for Survival first published as a special edition of The Ecologist magazine in the United Kingdom.
 James Lovelock first refers to the Gaia hypothesis in print.
 The Climatic Research Unit is founded by climatologist Hubert Lamb at the University of East Anglia in the UK.

Mathematics
 Daniel Quillen formulates higher algebraic K-theory.
 Daniel Gorenstein announces a 16-step program for completing the classification of finite simple groups.
 Richard M. Karp shows that the Hamiltonian cycle problem is NP-complete.

Medicine
 January 31 – Immunosuppressive effect of ciclosporin discovered by a team at Sandoz, Basel, under Hartmann F. Stähelin.
 Harvey J. Alter identifies the presence of hepatitis C virus.
 Tu Youyou and collaborators obtain a pure extract of the antiplasmodial drug artemisinin.
 Archie Cochrane publishes Effectiveness and Efficiency: Random Reflections on Health Services in the U.K.
 John Yudkin publishes Pure, White and Deadly in the U.K., warning of the dangers of sucrose in diet.
 The last major epidemic of smallpox in Europe breaks out in Yugoslavia.

Metrology
 00:00:00 UTC matches 00:00:10 TAI exactly and the tick rate of UTC is changed to match TAI exactly.

Paleontology
 Kielan-Jawarowska and Rinchen Barsbold report the associated remains of a Velociraptor and Protoceratops apparently killed and preserved while fighting.

Psychology
 Daniel Kahneman and Amos Tversky begin to publish together on cognitive bias and heuristics in judgment and decision-making.

Technology
 February 1 – The first scientific hand-held calculator (labeled Hewlett-Packard, later designated the HP-35) is introduced, at a price of $395.00.
 July 10 – Jack Cover files  for the original form of Taser electroshock weapon.
 English inventor Peter Powell develops a steerable dual-line kite.

Awards
 Nobel Prizes
 Physics – John Bardeen, Leon Neil Cooper, John Robert Schrieffer
 Chemistry – Christian B. Anfinsen, Stanford Moore, William H. Stein
 Medicine – Gerald Edelman, Rodney R Porter
 Turing Award – Edsger Dijkstra

Births
 March 31 – Evan Williams, American Internet entrepreneur.
 April 5 – Nima Arkani-Hamed, Canadian-American theoretical physicist.
 June 21 – Warren Lyford DeLano, American bioinformatician and open source advocate (d. 2009).
unknown date – Kathy Vivas, Venezuelan astrophysicist

Deaths
 February 20 – Maria Goeppert Mayer (b. 1906), German-American theoretical physicist, recipient of the Nobel Prize in Physics. 
 May 4 – Edward Calvin Kendall (b. 1886), American chemist, recipient of the Nobel Prize in Physiology or Medicine.
 May 8 – Beatrice Helen Worsley (b. 1921), Canadian computer scientist.
 August 11 – Max Theiler (b. 1899), South African-born American virologist, recipient of the Nobel Prize in Physiology or Medicine.
 August 22 – Ștefan Procopiu (b. 18990), Romanian physicist.
 August 25 – Lucien Bull (b. 1876), Irish-born French pioneer in chronophotography.
 October 1 – Louis Leakey (b. 1903), British paleoanthropologist.
 November 25 – Henri Coandă (b. 1886), Romanian aeronautical engineer.

References

 
20th century in science
1970s in science